Moberly Lake may refer to:

Moberly Lake, British Columbia, a community in British Columbia, Canada
Moberly Lake (British Columbia), a lake in British Columbia, Canada
Moberly Lake Provincial Park, a park in British Columbia, Canada